Jonathan Richard Matsumoto (born October 13, 1986) is a Canadian professional ice hockey player who is currently playing for Kölner Haie of the Deutsche Eishockey Liga (DEL).

Playing career
Matsumoto began playing collegiate hockey for the Bowling Green State University Falcons during the 2004-05 season. He became just the third freshman in Falcons' history to lead the team in scoring. After two successful seasons, he was drafted by the Philadelphia Flyers in the third round, 79th overall, of the 2006 NHL Entry Draft.

Following his junior season, Matsumoto began working out with the Flyers' AHL affiliate, the Philadelphia Phantoms. Flyers' management liked what they saw, and on March 14, 2007, Matsumoto decided to forgo his senior season and signed an entry level contract with the Flyers. He was assigned to the Phantoms and made his professional debut on March 16, 2007.

On June 26, 2010, Philadelphia traded Matsumoto to the Carolina Hurricanes for a 2010 seventh-round draft pick. Four months later Matsumoto made his NHL debut on November 1 against the Flyers. Matsumoto scored his first NHL goal on November 3, 2010 against Rick DiPietro of the New York Islanders. The game was also his first multi-goal game in the NHL, as he added a second goal in the third period.

Matsumoto was traded by the Hurricanes to the Florida Panthers on January 18, 2012 with Mattias Lindström, in exchange for Evgenii Dadonov and  A. J. Jenks.

On July 12, 2012, Matsumoto was signed as a free agent by the San Jose Sharks. He was directly assigned to the Worcester Sharks to start the 2012–13 season due to the NHL lockout. After scoring 32 points in 60 games, Matsumoto was loaned to the Chicago Wolves to end the year on April 8, 2013.

On July 8, 2013, Matsumoto returned to the Florida Panthers organization as a free agent, signing a one-year contract.

After spending the first 7 professional seasons of his career in North America, on May 26, 2014, Matsumoto agreed to his first European contract, signing a one-year deal with German club, Schwenninger Wild Wings of the DEL. After a season with the Wild Wings, Matsumoto joined fellow DEL competitor, Augsburger Panther on a one-year deal on July 23, 2015. He made 52 appearances for the Panthers, tallying 20 goals and 29 assists. 

On May 2, 2016, he put pen to paper on a deal with EHC München that had captured the German championship only some weeks earlier. Matsumoto won German championship titles with München in 2017 and 2018, earning DEL Playoff MVP distinction in 2018. On May 4, 2018, he signed with fellow DEL side Iserlohn Roosters.

Matsumoto continued his scoring pace in the 2018–19 season with the Roosters, potting a DEL personal best of 22 goals and 56 points in just 52 games. Despite interest to remain by the club to remain in Iserlohn, Matsumoto continued to build upon his journeyman status in the DEL, signing a one-year contract with his fifth German club, Kölner Haie, on May 2, 2019.

Career statistics

References

External links

1986 births
Living people
Adirondack Phantoms players
Augsburger Panther players
Bowling Green Falcons men's ice hockey players
EHC München players
Canadian ice hockey centres
Canadian sportspeople of Japanese descent
Carolina Hurricanes players
Charlotte Checkers (2010–) players
Chicago Wolves players
Florida Panthers players
Iserlohn Roosters players
Ice hockey people from Ottawa
Kölner Haie players
Philadelphia Flyers draft picks
Philadelphia Phantoms players
San Antonio Rampage players
Schwenninger Wild Wings players
Worcester Sharks players
Canadian expatriate ice hockey players in Germany